Shabnam "Mausi" Bano (शबनम मौसी) ("Mausi" noun. Hindi - "Aunty") is the first transgender Indian to be elected to public office (MLA). She was an elected member of the Madhya Pradesh State Legislative Assembly from 1998 to 2003. (Hijras were granted voting rights in 1994 in India.)

Early life
She was born visibly intersex and was given a masculine name. Her father, a police superintendent of the Brahmin caste, gave her away shortly after she was born to protect his own social image.

She attended only two years of primary schooling but learned 12 languages during her travels.

Political career
Shabnam Mausi was elected from the Sohagpur Assembly constituency in Madhya Pradesh state's Shahdol-Anuppur district. As a member of the Legislative Assembly, her agenda included fighting corruption, unemployment, poverty, and hunger, as well as speaking out against discrimination against transgender people, hijras, eunuchs, cross-dressers and raising awareness about HIV/AIDS.

Activism
Shabnam Mausi inspired many transgender people in India to take up politics and participate in 'mainstream activities' in India, giving up their traditional roles as dancers, prostitutes, and beggars, living on the fringes of Indian society; for example they sometimes attend weddings or the house of a newborn child offering services to ward off bad luck.

Jeeti Jitayi Politics (JJP)
In 2003, hijras in Madhya Pradesh established their own political party called "Jeeti Jitayi Politics" (JJP), which literally means 'politics that has already been won'. The party released an eight-page manifesto to outline its political differences from the mainstream.

Popular culture
In 2005, a fiction feature film titled Shabnam Mausi was made about her life. It was directed by Yogesh Bharadwaj, and the role of Shabnam Mausi was played by Ashutosh Rana.

Although she is no longer in public office, Shabnam Mausi continues to participate actively in AIDS/HIV education with NGOs and gender activists in India.

"We brothers and sisters often face stigma and discrimination because of our sexual orientation and gender identity. Talking openly about AIDS helps us understand each other!" - Shabnam Mausi

References

External links
Eunuch MP takes Seat - BBC news
Article on the fiction feature film made on Shabnam Mausi
The film 

Living people
LGBT Hindus
Indian LGBT rights activists
Transgender politicians
Madhya Pradesh MLAs 1998–2003
Transgender rights activists
Year of birth missing (living people)
Hijra (South Asia) people
LGBT legislators
Indian LGBT politicians
Indian transgender people